Vlastenské Theatre ('Vlastenské divadlo') was a historic theatre in Prague, active between 1786 and 1811. It was a pioneer institution as the first Czech language theatre in Prague. While the Estates Theatre occasionally gave Czech language performances from 1785 onward, the Vlastenské was the first theatre to give exclusively Czech language plays. The theatre had numerous names during its relatively short existence, and it changed building several times.

See also
 Katharina Butteau

References

 http://encyklopedie.idu.cz/index.php/Vlastensk%C3%A9_divadlo
 Česká divadla. Encyklopedie divadelních souborů, ed. E. Šormová, Praha: Divadelní ústav 2000

18th century in Prague
Former theatres
1786 establishments in Europe
1811 disestablishments in Europe
1810s disestablishments in the Austrian Empire
Theatres completed in 1786